The Kids Grow Up is a 1942 Argentine film directed by Carlos Hugo Christensen and starring Arturo García Buhr, Santiago Gómez Cou and María Duval.  At the 1943 Argentine Film Critics Association Awards, Arturo García Buhr won the  Silver Condor Award for Best Actor for his performance in the film.

Cast
Arturo García Buhr
Santiago Gómez Cou
María Duval
Pepita Serrador
Maruja Gil Quesada
Miguel Gómez Bao
Aurelia Ferrer
Mariana Martí
Tito Alonso
Arturo Arcari

References

External links
 

1942 films
1940s Spanish-language films
Argentine black-and-white films
1940s coming-of-age comedy-drama films
Argentine comedy-drama films
1942 comedy films
1942 drama films
Argentine coming-of-age films
1940s Argentine films